WFTM-FM (95.9 FM) is a radio station  broadcasting a mix of soft adult contemporary and adult contemporary formats. Licensed to Maysville, Kentucky, United States, the station is currently owned by Standard Tobacco Company, Inc. and features programming from Jones Radio Network.

References

External links

Soft adult contemporary radio stations in the United States
Mainstream adult contemporary radio stations in the United States
FTM-FM